Andrew Stark is an Australian candid and urban street photographer, active since the early 1980s and based in Sydney.

Early life and education
Stark was born in Sydney and educated at Newington College (1976–1981).

Life and work
Stark lives on the Central Coast, New South Wales.

In 2003, his first book, Snaps from Sydney, was self-published. A second, Candidly Inclined, followed in 2005. From September 2006 to February 2007 an exhibition of his work, Starkers, was held at the Museum of Sydney. Throughout 2007, Stark documented the Sutherland Shire district, known for the 2005 Cronulla race riots, and the resulting exhibit Down South was commissioned and shown at Hazelhurst Gallery, Sydney in late 2008. A third book, Escaping into Life: A psycho study of the contemporary street photographer was self-published in 2010. A review of his work in Black+White magazine stated, "Stark's idiomatic and wryly observed urban photographs of Sydney, Australia, represent a vital continuation of documentary street photography, reflecting similar social concerns and the same aesthetic irony as Robert Frank, William Klein and Garry Winogrand." In 2019 he published Here come the townies: The early history of Gosford Rugby League: 1890–1950.

He works in black and white using a Konica TC film camera and a 28 or 40 mm lens. "He is drawn in by the emotions of his subjects – a fleeting look of vulnerability, a spontaneous burst of joy, or the blank stare of melancholy."

Books
Snaps from Sydney. Heathcote, NSW: Andrew Stark & Kate Pascoe, 2003. .
Candidly Inclined: The Photography of Andrew Stark. Heathcote, NSW: Andrew Stark, 2005. .
Escaping into Life: A Psycho Study of the Contemporary Street Photographer. Sydney: Andrew Stark, 2010. .
Here Come the Townies: The Early History of Gosford Rugby League: 1890–1950. East Gosford: Andrew Stark & Kate Pascoe, 2019. .

References

External links
 2007 interview with weAREtheIMAGEmakers (watim.com)

 Famous Photographers https://www.famousphotographers.net/andrew-stark

 HEAT magazine https://giramondopublishing.com/heat/archive/down-south-andrew-stark-daniel-mudie-cunningham/

 Magpie Memoir Magazine

 Gosford Rugby League:the Eye of the Storm magazine

Australian photographers
Artists from Sydney
Living people
People educated at Newington College
Year of birth missing (living people)